David Spangler (born January 7, 1945) is an American spiritual philosopher and self-described "practical mystic."  He helped transform the Findhorn Foundation in northern Scotland into a center of residential spiritual education and was a friend of William Irwin Thompson. Spangler is considered one of the founding figures of the modern New Age movement, although he is highly critical of what much of the movement has since become, especially its commercial and sensationalist elements.

Childhood and education
Spangler was born in Columbus, Ohio in 1945.  At the age of six, he moved to Morocco in North Africa where his father was assigned as a counterintelligence agent for U.S. Army Intelligence.  He lived there for six years, returning to the United States when he was twelve in 1957.  He attended Deerfield Academy in Massachusetts, which was considered a Protestant school. His time at Deerfield was interrupted when his family moved to Phoenix, Arizona, where he graduated from high school.  He attended Arizona State University where he was working for a Bachelor of Science degree in biochemistry but continued to pursue other subjects of interest.

Clairvoyant development
From his earliest years, Spangler has argued he was clairvoyantly aware of non-physical entities. While in Morocco at age seven, he said he had a classical mystical experience of merging with a timeless presence of oneness within the cosmos and then remembering his existence prior to this life as well as the process by which he chose to become David Spangler and entered into his present incarnation.  Following that experience, he claims his awareness of and contact with various inner worlds of spirit was heightened, though he believed throughout his childhood that everyone shared the kind of perception and experience that he had.  This changed when he moved to Phoenix where he met other individuals who were clairvoyant or were acting as "channels" for non-physical entities and realized that his own inner experiences were not common.  In his late teens he was asked by members of metaphysical study groups to give talks on his own inner contacts, leading up to 1964 when he gave the keynote address at a national spiritual conference on "Youth and the New Age."  This led to his receiving a number of invitations from around the United States to come and give lectures to various spiritual and metaphysical organizations.  At the time he refused these invitations to concentrate on his scientific studies, but the following year, in 1965, he felt called by his own inner spirit to leave college and begin sharing his own particular insights and inner perceptions.

This led to his going to Los Angeles in the summer of 1965 where a series of lectures led to further invitations and resulted in the career that he has followed since then as a lecturer and teacher of spirituality. Some of this early history can be found in his books Apprenticed to Spirit, Blessing: The Art and the Practice and Pilgrim in Aquarius.

The Findhorn Foundation

In 1970, Spangler went to Britain where he visited the spiritual community of Findhorn in northern Scotland.  He claimed to have been told by non-physical, spiritual contacts that he would find his "next cycle of work" in Europe; he arrived at Findhorn and was told that one of the founders, Eileen Caddy, had had a vision three years earlier that a David Spangler would be coming there to live and work in the community.  Not knowing who David Spangler was, but having read a small booklet written by him which someone sent to them, Eileen and her husband Peter Caddy and their Canadian colleague, Dorothy Maclean, the three founders of the Findhorn Community, had been waiting for someone with that name to arrive.  Sometime after Spangler's arrival, he was offered and accepted joint directorship of the community along with Peter Caddy. He remained in the Findhorn Community until 1973. He then returned to the United States with a number of other Americans and Europeans, including Dorothy Maclean, where they founded the Lorian Association as a non-profit vehicle for the spiritual and educational work they wished to do together.

Lindisfarne Association
Also in 1974 Spangler helped William Irwin Thompson, the author of At the Edge of History, The Time Falling Bodies Take to Light, and various other books on contemporary culture, science and spirit, to found the Lindisfarne Association and became one of the first Lindisfarne Fellows, a group of scientists, artists, religious teachers, political activists, economists, and visionaries whose number included Gregory Bateson, John and Nancy Todd, Elaine Pagels, E. F. Schumacher, Stewart Brand, Paul Hawken, James Lovelock, and Paul Winter, among others.

Going beyond the "New Age"
Over the years since then, Spangler has continued to lecture and teach and has written numerous books on spirituality. He is considered one of the founding figures of the modern New Age phenomenon, but early on he identified its shadow and rejected what he termed "its further outgrowth into a myriad of 'old age' pursuits (including spiritual pursuits) dressed in 'new age' garb". This devolution into commercially-driven fads, identity politics, mystical glamour, atavistic spiritualisms, and uncritical guru reverence was a main theme of his Reimagination of the World, co-authored with fellow-traveler and cultural historian William Irwin Thompson.

Spangler has often been miscast as a new-age channeler due in part to the "transmissions" received while living at the intentional community at Findhorn, Scotland in the 1970s, which became the core of his first book Revelation: The Birth of a New Age. In hindsight it can be seen that Spangler's ideas were at that time transitional between the earlier theosophical esotericism represented by Alice Bailey and an emerging worldview that is more postmodern, less obscure, and less metaphysical than theosophy. Spangler himself reports that it took him some years to develop a language in which to communicate clearly the insights and experiences he had been having since childhood.

Recent Activities
In recent years he has emphasized a practical or incarnational spirituality in which our everyday lives—our physical, embodied, sometimes resplendent and sometimes shabby persons—can be experienced as spiritual or sacred, as opposed to a spirituality concerned solely with the transpersonal and transcendent. Spangler defines Incarnational Spirituality most simply as the exploration and celebration of the individual and his or her unique spiritual and creative capacities.  The practice of Incarnational Spirituality is one of honoring the sacredness and sovereignty of each of us and practicing our powers of blessing, manifestation, collaboration, and loving engagement with life.  It is not a religious practice, but an understanding of how we connect to this world and how we may grow and develop and shape ourselves and our world by our intention, presence, participation and service.

In 2010 his memoir Apprenticed to Spirit was published by Riverhead Books, describing his early years, his spiritual training, his association with Findhorn, Lindisfarne, and the New Age Movement, and his subsequent work with the Lorian Association and the development of Incarnational Spirituality.

Spangler is currently the Director of the Lorian Center for Incarnational Spirituality and a Director of the Lorian Association (www.lorian.org).  Through Lorian, he publishes a free monthly essay, David's Desk, and a subscription-only quarterly esoteric journal, Views from the Borderland, offering "field notes" from his clairvoyant researches and encounters with the subtle worlds.

References

Partial bibliography
 Revelation: Birth of a New Age, by David Spangler, Findhorn Press, 1971
 The Little Church, by David Spangler, Findhorn Press, 1972
 The Laws of Manifestation, Findhorn Press, 1975
 Towards a Planetary Vision, by David Spangler, Findhorn Press, 1976
 Relationship and Identity, by David Spangler, Findhorn Press, 1977
 Reflections on the Christ, Findhorn Press, 1978
 Emergence: The Rebirth of the Sacred, by David Spangler, Doubleday, 1986
 Reimagination of the World: A Critique of the New Age, Science, and Popular Culture, by David Spangler (with William Irwin Thompson), Bear and Co., 1991
 Everyday Miracles, by David Spangler, Bantam, 1996
 The Call, by David Spangler, Riverhead Books, 1996
 A Pilgrim in Aquarius, by David Spangler, Findhorn Press, 1996
 Parent as Mystic, Mystic as Parent, by David Spangler, Riverhead Books, 1998
 Blessing: The Art and the Practice, by David Spangler, Riverhead Books, 2001
 The Story Tree, by David Spangler, Lorian Press, 2004
 The Manifestation Kit, Lorian Press, 2005
 The Incarnational Card Deck, by David Spangler, Lorian Press, 2008
 The Laws of Manifestation (revised),by David Spangler,RedWheel/Weiser Books, 2009
 Incarnational Spirituality, by David Spangler,Lorian Press, 2009
 The Flame of Incarnation, by David Spangler,Lorian Press, 2009
 Subtle Worlds, by David Spangler,Lorian Press, 2010
 Facing the Future, by David Spangler,Lorian Press, 2010
 An Introduction to Incarnational Spirituality, by David Spangler, Lorian Press, 2011
 A Midsummer's Journey, by David Spangler, Lorian Press, 2011
 The Call of the World, by David Spangler, Lorian Press, 2011
 The Soul's Oracle Card Deck, by David Spangler, Lorian Press, 2011
 The Card Deck of the Sidhe, by David Spangler, Lorian Press, 2011
 Apprenticed to Spirit, by David Spangler, Riverhead Books, 2011
 Numerous articles in various magazines, including New Age Journal, East-West Journal, The Sun, New Times.
 Lorian Textbooks: Slightly edited transcripts of online classes:
 World Work, by David Spangler, Lorian Press, 2008
 Crafting Home: Generating the Sacred, by David Spangler, Lorian Press, 2009
 Crafting Relationships:The Holding of Others, by David Spangler, Lorian Press, 2009
 Partnering With Earth, by David Spangler, Lorian Press, 2013
 Starheart and Other Stores, by David Spangler, Lorian Press, 2013
 Conversations with the Sidhe, by David Spangler, Lorian Press, 2014
 Journey into Fire, by David Spangler, Lorian Press, 2015

External links
 Lorian Association
 A Vision of Holarchy, Seven Pillars Review, 2008

1945 births
Living people
Writers from Columbus, Ohio
New Age writers
Arizona State University alumni
Deerfield Academy alumni
Findhorn community